Aaron Hayden may refer to:

 Aaron Hayden (American football) (born 1973), American football running back
 Aaron Hayden (footballer) (born 1997), English football defender